The "Rivers of Blood" speech was made by British Member of Parliament (MP) Enoch Powell on 20 April 1968, to a meeting of the  Conservative Political Centre in Birmingham, United Kingdom. His speech strongly criticised mass immigration, especially Commonwealth immigration to the United Kingdom and the proposed Race Relations Bill. It became known as the "Rivers of Blood" speech, although Powell always referred to it as "the Birmingham speech".

The expression "rivers of blood" did not appear in the speech but is an allusion to a line from Virgil's Aeneid which he quoted "as I look ahead, I am filled with foreboding; like the Roman, I seem to see 'the River Tiber foaming with much blood'".

The speech caused a political storm, making Powell one of the most talked about and divisive politicians in the country; it led to his controversial dismissal from the Shadow Cabinet by Conservative Party Leader Edward Heath. According to most accounts, the popularity of Powell's perspective on immigration may have been a decisive factor in the Conservatives' surprise victory in the 1970 general election, although he became one of the most persistent opponents of the subsequent Heath government.

Background 
Powell, the Conservative MP for Wolverhampton South West and Shadow Secretary of State for Defence, was addressing the general meeting of the West Midlands Area Conservative Political Centre. The Labour government's 1968 Race Relations Bill was to have its second reading three days later, and the Conservative Opposition had tabled an amendment significantly weakening its provisions. The bill was a successor to the Race Relations Act 1965.

The Birmingham-based television company ATV saw an advance copy of the speech on the Saturday morning, and its news editor ordered a television crew to go to the venue, where they filmed sections of the speech. Earlier in the week, Powell had said to his friend Clem Jones, a journalist and then editor at the Wolverhampton Express & Star, "I'm going to make a speech at the weekend and it's going to go up 'fizz' like a rocket; but whereas all rockets fall to the earth, this one is going to stay up."

In preparing his speech, Powell had applied Jones's advice that to make hard-hitting political speeches and short-circuit interference from his party organisation, his best timing was on Saturday afternoons, after delivering embargoed copies the previous Thursday or Friday to selected editors and political journalists of Sunday newspapers. This tactic could ensure coverage of the speech over three days through Saturday evening bulletins, then Sunday newspapers, thus the coverage would be picked up in Monday newspapers.

Speech 
In the speech Powell recounted a conversation with one of his constituents, a middle-aged working man, a few weeks earlier. Powell said that the man told him: "If I had the money to go, I wouldn't stay in this country... I have three children, all of them been through grammar school and two of them married now, with family. I shan't be satisfied till I have seen them all settled overseas." The man finished by saying to Powell: "In this country in 15 or 20 years' time the black man will have the whip hand over the white man".

Powell went on:

Powell quoted a letter he received from a woman in Northumberland, about an elderly woman living on a Wolverhampton street where she was the only white resident. The woman's husband and two sons had died in the Second World War and she had rented out the rooms in her house. Once immigrants had moved into the street in which she lived, her white lodgers left. Two black men had knocked on her door at 7:00 am to use her telephone to call their employers, but she refused, as she would have done to any other stranger knocking at her door at such an hour, and was subsequently verbally abused. The woman had asked her local authority for a rates reduction, but was told by a council officer to let out the rooms of her house. When the woman said the only tenants would be black, the council officer replied: "Racial prejudice won't get you anywhere in this country."

Powell advocated voluntary re-emigration by "generous grants and assistance" and he mentioned that immigrants had asked him whether it was possible. He said that all citizens should be equal before the law, and that:

He argued that journalists who urged the government to pass anti-discrimination laws were "of the same kidney and sometimes on the same newspapers which year after year in the 1930s tried to blind this country to the rising peril which confronted it". Powell described what he perceived to be the evolving position of the indigenous population:

Powell warned that if the legislation proposed for the then–Race Relations Bill were to be passed it would bring about discrimination against the native population:

Powell was concerned about the current level of immigration and argued that it must be controlled:

Powell argued that he felt that although "many thousands" of immigrants wanted to integrate, he felt that the majority did not, and that some had vested interests in fostering racial and religious differences "with a view to the exercise of actual domination, first over fellow-immigrants and then over the rest of the population". Powell's peroration of the speech gave rise to its popular title. He quotes the Sibyl's prophecy in the epic poem Aeneid, 6, 86–87, of "wars, terrible wars, / and the Tiber foaming with much blood".

Reaction

Political
According to C. Howard Wheeldon, who was present at the meeting in which Powell gave the speech, "it is fascinating to note what little hostility emerged from the audience. To the best of my memory, only one person voiced any sign of annoyance." The day after the speech, Powell went to Sunday Communion at his local church, and when he emerged, there was a crowd of journalists, and a local plasterer said to Powell: "Well done, sir. It needed to be said." Powell asked the assembled journalists: "Have I really caused such a furore?" At midday, Powell went on the BBC's World This Weekend to defend his speech, and he appeared later that day on ITN news.

The Labour MP Edward Leadbitter said he would refer the speech to the Director of Public Prosecutions, and the Liberal Party leader Jeremy Thorpe spoke of a prima facie case against Powell for incitement. Lady Gaitskell called the speech "cowardly", and the West Indian cricketer Sir Learie Constantine condemned it.

The leading Conservatives in the Shadow Cabinet were outraged by the speech. Iain Macleod, Edward Boyle, Quintin Hogg and Robert Carr all threatened to resign from the front bench unless Powell was sacked. Margaret Thatcher, who was then the Shadow Cabinet's Fuel and Power Spokesman, thought that some of Powell's speech was "strong meat", and said to the Conservative leader, Edward Heath when he telephoned her to inform her Powell was to be sacked: "I really thought that it was better to let things cool down for the present rather than heighten the crisis". Heath sacked Powell from his post as Shadow Defence Secretary, telling him on the telephone that Sunday evening (it was the last conversation they would have). Heath said of the speech in public that it was "racialist in tone and liable to exacerbate racial tensions". Conservative MPs on the right of the party—Duncan Sandys, Gerald Nabarro, Teddy Taylor—spoke against Powell's sacking. On 22 April 1968, Heath went on Panorama, telling Robin Day: "I dismissed Mr Powell because I believed his speech was inflammatory and liable to damage race relations. I am determined to do everything I can to prevent racial problems developing into civil strife ... I don't believe the great majority of the British people share Mr Powell's way of putting his views in his speech."

The Times declared it "an evil speech", stating "This is the first time that a serious British politician has appealed to racial hatred in this direct way in our postwar history." The Times went on to record incidents of racial attacks in the immediate aftermath of Powell's speech. One such incident, reported under the headline "Coloured family attacked", took place on 30 April 1968 in Wolverhampton itself: it involved a slashing incident with 14 white youths chanting "Powell" and "Why don't you go back to your own country?" at patrons of a West Indian christening party. One of the West Indian victims, Wade Crooks of Lower Villiers Street, was the child's grandfather. He had to have eight stitches over his left eye. He was reported as saying, "I have been here since 1955 and nothing like this has happened before. I am shattered." An opinion poll commissioned by the BBC television programme Panorama in December 1968 found that eight per cent of immigrants believed that they had been treated worse by white people since Powell's speech, 38 per cent would like to return to their country of origin if offered financial help, and 47 per cent supported immigration control, with 30 per cent opposed.

The speech generated much correspondence to newspapers, most markedly with the Express & Star in Wolverhampton itself, whose local sorting office over the following week received 40,000 postcards and 8,000 letters addressed to its local newspaper. Jones recalled:

At the end of that week there were two simultaneous processions in Wolverhampton, one of Powell's supporters and another of opponents, who each brought petitions to Jones outside his office, the two columns being kept apart by police.

On 23 April 1968, the Race Relations Bill had its second reading in the House of Commons. Many MPs referred or alluded to Powell's speech. For Labour, Paul Rose, Maurice Orbach, Reginald Paget, Dingle Foot, Ivor Richard and David Ennals were all critical. Among the Conservatives, Quintin Hogg and Nigel Fisher were critical, while Hugh Fraser, Ronald Bell, Dudley Smith and Harold Gurden were sympathetic. Powell himself was present for the debate but did not speak.

Earlier that day, 1,000 London dockers had gone on strike in protest of Powell's sacking and marched from the East End to the Palace of Westminster carrying placards with sayings such as "we want Enoch Powell!", "Enoch here, Enoch there, we want Enoch everywhere", "Don't knock Enoch" and "Back Britain, not Black Britain". Three hundred of them went into the palace, 100 to lobby the MP for Stepney, Peter Shore, and 200 to lobby the MP for Poplar, Ian Mikardo. Shore and Mikardo were shouted down and some dockers kicked Mikardo. Lady Gaitskell shouted: "You will have your remedy at the next election." The dockers replied: "We won't forget." The organiser of the strike, Harry Pearman, headed a delegation to meet Powell and said after: "I have just met Enoch Powell and it made me feel proud to be an Englishman. He told me that he felt that if this matter was swept under the rug he would lift the rug and do the same again. We are representatives of the working man. We are not racialists."

On 24 April 600 dockers at St Katharine Docks voted to strike and numerous smaller factories across the country followed. Six hundred Smithfield meat porters struck and marched to Westminster and handed Powell a 92-page petition supporting him. Powell advised against strike action and asked them to write to Harold Wilson, Heath or their MP. However, strikes continued, reaching Tilbury by 25 April and he allegedly received his 30,000th letter supporting him, with 30 protesting against his speech. By 27 April, 4,500 dockers were on strike. On 28 April, 1,500 people marched to Downing Street chanting "Arrest Enoch Powell". Powell claimed to have received 43,000 letters and 700 telegrams supporting him by early May, with 800 letters and four telegrams against. On 2 May, the attorney-general, Sir Elwyn Jones, announced he would not prosecute Powell after consulting the Director of Public Prosecutions.

The Gallup Organization took an opinion poll at the end of April and found that 74 per cent agreed with what Powell had said in his speech; 15 per cent disagreed. 69 per cent felt Heath was wrong to sack Powell and 20 per cent believed Heath was right. Before his speech Powell was favoured to replace Heath as Conservative leader by one per cent, with Reginald Maudling favoured by 20 per cent; after his speech 24 per cent favoured Powell and 18 per cent Maudling. 83 per cent now felt immigration should be restricted (75 per cent before the speech) and 65 per cent favoured anti-discrimination legislation. According to George L. Bernstein, the speech made the British people think that Powell "was the first British politician who was actually listening to them".

Powell defended his speech on 4 May through an interview for the Birmingham Post: "What I would take 'racialist' to mean is a person who believes in the inherent inferiority of one race of mankind to another, and who acts and speaks in that belief. So the answer to the question of whether I am a racialist is 'no'—unless, perhaps, it is to be a racialist in reverse. I regard many of the peoples in India as being superior in many respects—intellectually, for example, and in other respects—to Europeans. Perhaps that is over-correcting." On 5 May the Prime Minister, Harold Wilson, made his first public statement on race and immigration since Powell's speech. He told Labour supporters at a May Day rally in Birmingham Town Hall:

I am not prepared to stand aside and see this country engulfed by the racial conflict which calculating orators or ignorant prejudice can create. Nor in the great world confrontation on race and colour, where this country must declare where it stands, am I prepared to be a neutral, whether that confrontation is in Birmingham or Bulawayo. In these issues there can be no neutrals and no escape from decision. For in the world of today, while political isolationism invites danger and economic isolationism invites bankruptcy, moral isolationism invites contempt.

In a speech to the Labour Party conference in Blackpool that October, Wilson said: 

We are the party of human rights—the only party of human rights that will be speaking from this platform this month. (Loud applause.) The struggle against racialism is a worldwide fight. It is the dignity of man for which we are fighting. If what we assert is true for Birmingham, it is true for Bulawayo. If ever there were a condemnation of the values of the party which forms the Opposition it is the fact that the virus of Powellism has taken so firm a hold at every level.

During the 1970 general election the majority of the Parliamentary Labour Party did not wish to "stir up the Powell issue". However, Labour MP Tony Benn said:

According to most accounts, the popularity of Powell's perspective on immigration may have played a decisive contributory factor in the Conservatives' surprise victory in the 1970 general election, although Powell became one of the most persistent opponents of the subsequent Heath government. In "exhaustive research" on the election, the American pollster Douglas Schoen and University of Oxford academic R. W. Johnson believed it "beyond dispute" that Powell had attracted 2.5 million votes to the Conservatives, but nationally the Conservative vote had increased by only 1.7 million since 1966. In his own constituency at that election – his last in Wolverhampton – his majority of 26,220 and a 64.3 per cent share of the vote were then the highest of his career.

Powell's reflection on the speech
Powell reflected on the speech in an interview in 1977 when the interviewer asked him, "nine years after the speech, are we still in your view on a kind of funeral pyre?":

The interviewer then asked him, "what do you see as the likely prospect now? Still the 'River Tiber foaming with blood'?":

Cultural
Polls in the 1960s and 1970s showed that Powell's views were popular among the British population at the time. A Gallup poll, for example, showed that 75% of the population were sympathetic to Powell's views. An NOP poll showed that approximately 75% of the British population agreed with Powell's demand for non-white immigration to be halted completely, and about 60% agreed with his call for the repatriation of non-whites already resident in Britain.

The Rivers of Blood speech has been blamed for leading to violent attacks against British Pakistanis and other British Asians, which became frequent after the speech in 1968; however, there is "little agreement on the extent to which Powell was responsible for racial attacks". These "Paki-bashing" attacks later peaked during the 1970s and 1980s.

Powell was mentioned in early versions of the 1969 song "Get Back" by the Beatles. This early version of the song, known as the "No Pakistanis" version, parodied the anti-immigrant views of Enoch Powell.

On 5 August 1976, Eric Clapton provoked an uproar and lingering controversy when he spoke out against increasing immigration during a concert in Birmingham. Visibly intoxicated, Clapton voiced his support of the controversial speech, and announced on stage that Britain was in danger of becoming a "black colony". Among other things, Clapton said "Keep Britain white!" which was at the time a National Front slogan.

In November 2010, the actor and comedian Sanjeev Bhaskar recalled the fear which the speech instilled in Britons of Indian origin: "At the end of the 1960s, Enoch Powell was quite a frightening figure to us. He was the one person who represented an enforced ticket out, so we always had suitcases that were ready and packed. My parents held the notion that we may have to leave."

While a section of the white population appeared to warm to Powell over the speech, the author Mike Phillips recalls that it legitimised hostility, and even violence, towards black Britons like himself.

In his book The British Dream (2013), David Goodhart claims that Powell's speech in effect "put back by more than a generation a robust debate about the successes and failures of immigration".

Identity of the woman mentioned in the speech 
After Powell delivered the speech, there were attempts to locate the Wolverhampton constituent whom Powell described as being victimised by non-white residents. The editor of the local Wolverhampton newspaper the Express & Star, Jones (a close friend of Powell who broke off relations with him over the controversy) claimed he was unable to identify the woman using the electoral roll and other sources.

Shortly after Powell's death, Kenneth Nock, a Wolverhampton solicitor, wrote to the Express and Star in April 1998 to claim that his firm had acted for the woman in question, but that he could not name her owing to rules concerning client confidentiality. In January 2007, the BBC Radio Four programme Document claimed to have uncovered the woman's identity. They said she was Druscilla Cotterill (1907–1978), the widow of Harry Cotterill, a battery quartermaster sergeant with the Royal Artillery who had been killed in the Second World War. (She was also the second cousin of Mark Cotterill, a figure in British far-right politics.) She lived in Brighton Place in Wolverhampton, which by the 1960s was dominated by immigrant families. In order to increase her income, she rented rooms to lodgers, but did not wish to rent rooms to West Indians and stopped taking in any lodgers when the Race Relations Act 1968 banned racial discrimination in housing. She locked up the spare rooms and lived only in two rooms of the house.

Support for the speech 
In the United Kingdom, particularly in England, "Enoch [Powell] was right" is a phrase of political rhetoric, inviting comparison of aspects of current English society with the predictions made by Powell in the "Rivers of Blood" speech. The phrase implies criticism of racial quotas, immigration and multiculturalism. Badges, T-shirts and other items bearing the slogan have been produced at different times in the United Kingdom. Powell gained support from both right-wing and traditionally left-leaning, working-class voters for his anti-immigration stance.

Powell gained the support of the far-right in Britain. Badges, T-shirts and fridge magnets emblazoned with the slogan "Enoch was right" are regularly seen at far-right demonstrations, according to VICE News. Powell also has a presence on social media, with an Enoch Powell page on Facebook run by the far-right Traditional Britain Group which amassed several thousands of likes, and similar pages which post "racist memes and Daily Mail stories" have been equally successful, such as British nationalist and anti-immigration Britain First's Facebook page.

In The Trial of Enoch Powell, a Channel 4 television broadcast in April 1998, on the thirtieth anniversary of his Rivers of Blood speech (and two months after his death), 64% of the studio audience voted that Powell was not a racist. Some in the Church of England, of which Powell had been a member, took a different view. Upon Powell's death, Barbados-born Wilfred Wood, then Bishop of Croydon, stated, "Enoch Powell gave a certificate of respectability to white racist views which otherwise decent people were ashamed to acknowledge".

In March 2016, right-wing German writer Michael Stürmer wrote a retrospective pro-Powell piece in Die Welt, opining that nobody else had been "punished so mercilessly" by fellow party members and media for their viewpoints.

Trevor Phillips wrote in May 2016 "Rome may not yet be in flames, but I think I can smell the smouldering whilst we hum to the music of liberal self-delusion" by ignoring the effects of mass immigration. He explicitly compared his warning to Powell's: "He too summoned up echoes of Rome with his reference to Virgil's dire premonition of the River Tiber 'foaming with much blood'". From the damage the reaction to the speech did to Powell's career, Phillips wrote, "Everyone in British public life learnt the lesson: adopt any strategy possible to avoid saying anything about race, ethnicity (and latterly religion and belief) that is not anodyne and platitudinous".

In October 2018, support for the speech was expressed by the Plymouth University Conservatives who referenced the phrase "Enoch was Right" on one of the apparel worn for a society gathering.

Acknowledgement from politicians 
In an interview for Today shortly after her departure from office as Prime Minister in 1990, Margaret Thatcher, said that Powell had "made a valid argument, if in sometimes regrettable terms".

Thirty years after the speech, Heath said that Powell's remarks on the "economic burden of immigration" had been "not without prescience".

The Labour Party MP Michael Foot remarked to a reporter that it was "tragic" that this "outstanding personality" had been widely misunderstood as predicting actual bloodshed in Britain, when in fact he had used the Aeneid quotation merely to communicate his own sense of foreboding.

In November 2007, Nigel Hastilow resigned as Conservative candidate for Halesowen and Rowley Regis after he wrote an article in the Wolverhampton Express & Star that included the statement: "Enoch, once MP for Wolverhampton South-West, was sacked from the Conservative front bench and marginalised politically for his 1968 'Rivers of Blood' speech, warning that uncontrolled immigration would change Britain irrevocably. He was right and immigration has changed the face of Britain dramatically."

In January 2014, UK Independence Party leader Nigel Farage, after being told during an interview that a statement just read to him had come from Powell's speech, said: "Well what he was warning about was the large influx of people into an area, that change an area beyond recognition, there is tension – the basic principle is right." In June of that year, in response to the alleged Islamist Operation Trojan Horse, Conservative peer and former minister Norman Tebbit wrote in The Daily Telegraph, "No one should have been surprised at what was going on in schools in Birmingham. It is precisely what I was talking about over 20 years ago and Enoch Powell was warning against long before that. We have imported far too many immigrants who have come here not to live in our society, but to replicate here the society of their homelands." Conservative MP Gerald Howarth said on the same issue, "Clearly, the arrival of so many people of non-Christian faith has presented a challenge, as so many of us, including the late Enoch Powell, warned decades ago."

In April 2018, the leader of UKIP in Wales, Neil Hamilton, said that "the idea that Enoch Powell was some kind of uniquely racist villain is absolute nonsense". Hamilton said that Powell had been "proved right by events" in terms of social change if not violence. In response, the leader of Plaid Cymru, Leanne Wood, accused Hamilton of "keeping Powell's racist rhetoric going". Labour AM Hefin David described Hamilton's comments as "outrageous".

Dramatic portrayals
The speech is the subject of a play, What Shadows, written by Chris Hannan. The play was staged in Birmingham from 27 October to 12 November 2016, with Powell portrayed by Ian McDiarmid and Jones by George Costigan.

The Speech, a novel by author Andrew Smith set in Wolverhampton during the ten days before and after the speech and featuring Powell as a character, was published in October 2016 by Urbane Publications.

In April 2018 the BBC announced that Archive on 4 would transmit 50 Years On: Rivers of Blood, a programme marking the 50th anniversary of the speech. Ian McDiarmid would read the entire speech, the first time it would be broadcast on British radio, and it would be discussed and analysed. In the days before the broadcast, there was criticism from a number of commentators of the BBC's decision to broadcast the still-controversial speech.

On New Year's Day 2023, Season 12 Episode 1 of Call the Midwife ('April 1968') aired, dealing with the aftermath and impact of the speech, including the 1968 dockworkers' strike.

See also 

 Criticism of multiculturalism
 Demographics of the United Kingdom
 Great replacement theory
 Le bruit et l'odeur
 Protests of 1968
 Racism in the UK Conservative Party

References

Further reading 
 Bourne, Jenny. "The beatification of Enoch Powell". Race & Class 49.4 (2008): 82–87. Argues "we are witnessing the beginnings of his rehabilitation as an authoritative political figure."
 Crines, Andrew, Tim Heppell, and Michael Hill. "Enoch Powell’s ‘Rivers of Blood’ speech: A rhetorical political analysis". British Politics 11#1 (2016): 72–94. online
 Deakin, N. and Bourne, J. "Powell, and the minorities and the 1970 election". Political Quarterly (1970) 44#4: 399–415.
 
 

 
 Norton, P. "The Oratory of Enoch Powell" in Hayton R. and Crines, A. (eds.) Conservative Orators from Baldwin to Cameron (Manchester University Press, 2015).
 
 Whipple, Amy. "Revisiting the 'Rivers of Blood' Controversy: Letters to Enoch Powell". Journal of British Studies 48#3 (2009): 717–735.

Primary sources

External links 
 Enoch Powell's 'Rivers of Blood' speech, The Daily Telegraph, 6 November 2007 – Full text of the speech
 Document – The Woman Who Never Was? BBC Radio 4, 22 January 2007
 Radio Interview on Immigration Powell interviewed shortly after his controversial "Rivers of Blood" speech, BBC News (Audio clip, 3:31 mins, requires RealPlayer to listen)
 Speech that has raised a storm Press reaction from the Birmingham Post, 22 April 1968
 "Rivers of Blood, The Real Source", BBC Radio 4, 3 March 2008
 50 Years On: Rivers of Blood, BBC Radio 4, Archive on 4, 14 April 2018

1968 in British politics
1968 in England
1968 speeches
1960s in Birmingham, West Midlands
Anti-immigration politics in the United Kingdom
April 1968 events in the United Kingdom
Criticism of multiculturalism
Enoch Powell
History of Birmingham, West Midlands
History of immigration to the United Kingdom
History of the Conservative Party (UK)
Works about immigration